Jorge Manuel Soares Lopes (born 5 September 1942) is a former Portuguese professional footballer.

Career statistics

Club

Notes

References

External links

1942 births
Living people
Portuguese footballers
Portugal youth international footballers
Association football forwards
Primeira Liga players
C.D. Montijo players
S.L. Benfica footballers
Associação Académica de Coimbra – O.A.F. players
Seixal F.C. players
People from Montijo, Portugal
Sportspeople from Setúbal District